Bedrovo is a village in Chernoochene Municipality, in Kardzhali Province, in southern-central Bulgaria.

References

Villages in Kardzhali Province